Holly Kiser (born 1986) is an American fashion model. She was the first winner of Make Me a Supermodel.

Career 
Holly is currently signed with L.A Model Management in Los Angeles, Connected Models in Hong Kong and Red eleven in Auckland, New Zealand.

She has appeared in GQ magazine, and on the cover of City Luxe. She has also appeared in Metrocity ads and in Fashion Workshop, Jessica Code, In Magazine and other various magazines.

References

External links 
 
  
 New York Model Management Site
 Holly's Bravo profile

1986 births
Female models from Virginia
Reality modeling competition winners
Living people
People from Coeburn, Virginia
21st-century American women